Mohammad Beheshti Shirazi (born 28 February 1952) is an Iranian politician, artist and cultural figure who is currently Deputy Head of Cultural Heritage and Tourism Organization. He was the first head of Cultural Heritage, Handcrafts and Tourism Organization, being appointed on 2 September 1997 by Mohammad Khatami and held the office until 2 June 2003 when he replaced with Hossein Marashi. He was also head of the Fajr International Film Festival and a member of Iranian Academy of the Arts. He is an assistant professor at Shahid Beheshti University.

He is the younger brother of Alireza Beheshti Shirazi, one of the advisers of Mir-Hossein Mousavi during 2009 presidential election.

References

1952 births
Living people
Islamic Iran Participation Front politicians
People from Shiraz
Heads of Cultural Heritage, Handicrafts and Tourism Organization